Parvathi Kalyana is a 1967 Indian Kannada-language film, directed by B. S. Ranga and produced by B. S. Ranga. The film stars Rajkumar, Chandrakala, Udaykumar, M. P. Shankar and Raghavendra Rao. The film has musical score by G. K. Venkatesh.

Cast

Rajkumar as Lord Shiva
Chandrakala as Goddess Parvathi
Udaykumar as Narada
M. P. Shankar as Taraka
Raghavendra Rao
Dinesh
Kuppuraj
Master Babu
Pandari Bai
M. Jayashree
Vijayalalitha
Baby Prashanth
Baby Sunanda

Soundtrack
The music was composed by G. K. Venkatesh and lyrics by Chi. Sadashivaiah.

References

External links
 
 

1960s Kannada-language films
Films scored by G. K. Venkatesh
Hindu mythological films
Films directed by B. S. Ranga